The Évora Football Association (Associação de Futebol de Évora, abrv. AF Évora) is the district governing body for all football competitions in the Portuguese district of Évora. It is also the regulator of the clubs registered in the district.

Notable clubs in the Évora FA

 Lusitano de Évora
 Juventude de Évora
 Estrela de Vendas Novas

Current Divisions: 2013–14 season
The AF Évora runs the following divisions covering the fifth and sixth tiers of the Portuguese football league system.

Divisão de Elite

Atlético de Reguengos
Casa do Povo de Cabrela - Grupo Desportivo
Casa do Povo de Lavre
Clube de Futebol de Estremoz
Grupo Desportivo de Monte Trigo
Grupo Desportivo de Portel
Grupo Desportivo Os Oriolenses
Juventude de Évora
O Calipolense Clube Desportivo
Redondense Futebol Clube
Sociedade União Perolivense
Sporting Clube de Viana do Alentejo

Divisão de Honra - Série A

Aldeense Futebol Clube
Associação Desportiva e Cultural de Santiago Maior
Casa de Cultura de Corval
Grupo Desportivo e Cultural de São Bartolomeu do Outeiro
Grupo Desportivo e Recreativo Canaviais
Lusitano de Évora
Sport Clube Borbense
Sport Clube Bencatelense

Divisão de Honra - Série B

Grupo Desportivo Unidos da Giesteira
Grupo Estrela Escouralense
Futebol Clube de Santana do Campo
Grupo Cultural e Desportivo Fazendas do Cortiço
Lusitano Clube Desportivo Arraiolense
Luso Futebol Clube Morense
Sport Clube Alcaçovense
Sport Clube Brotense
Valenças Sport Clube

See also
 Portuguese District Football Associations
 Portuguese football competitions
 List of football clubs in Portugal

References 

Portuguese District Football Associations